Que el cielo espere sentao (in English: Let Heaven await Sitting) is Spanish pop singer Melendi's second album. It sold more than 200,000 copies and was later rereleased with three new songs.

Track listing 

 Caminando por la vida
 Billy el pistolero
 Como dijo el rey
 Con tanto héroe
 Novia a la fuga
 Con sólo una sonrisa
 Hasta que la muerte los separe
 Como se bailan los tangos
 Cuestión de prioridades
 Con tu amor es suficiente
 Cannabis
 Que el cielo espere sentao
 El Nano (Bonus Track Reissue)
 La dama y el vagabundo (Bonus Track Reissue)
 Carlota (Bonus Track Reissue)

Melendi albums
2005 albums